English is a widespread lingua franca of Algeria according to the CIA World Factbook.

Presentation
According to the Euromonitor International site, the English language was spoken in 2012 by 7% of Algerians, and learning this language is also explained by the fact that many Algerians have emigrated to the United Kingdom and other English-speaking countries.

Education

Since the independence of Algeria in 1962, the English language has been taught to the majority of students from the middle level. In July 2022, Algerian President Abdelmadjid Tebboune announced that primary schools will start to teach English in late 2022.

Media

There is no English-speaking Algeria television channel, and just as no radio channel broadcasts in English.

Even the  channel only produces a few minutes of English-language programs a day, which are broadcast on the air from 8 p.m.

Newspapers

There is no English daily or periodical newspaper that is published in Algeria.

It was only the Arabic-speaking newspaper Echorouk El Yawmi which tried in collaboration with the British Council to popularize the English language in Algeria by devoting one to two pages per week for initiation into this language.

See also
 Geographical distribution of English speakers
 English-speaking world
 List of territorial entities where English is an official language
 Ministry of National Education (Algeria)
 Ministry of Higher Education and Scientific Research (Algeria)
 Radio Algeria
 Television in Algeria

References

English
Education in Algeria
Mass media in Algeria
News media in Algeria
Broadcasting in Algeria
Newspapers published in Algeria
Algeria
fr:Langues en Algérie#Anglais